Wolfgang Hofmann (30 March 1941 – 12 March 2020) was a West German judoka who competed in the 1964 Summer Olympics in Tokyo in 1964, where he won the silver medal in the middleweight class representing the United Team of Germany.

Hofmann was German champion 15 times and European champion three times. He was the holder of the 8th Dan, as well as being a lecturer for judo at the German Sport University in Cologne for many years. He further developed his skills during two language and study visits to Japan. He shaped the training and examination regulations of the German Judo Association (DJB).

Hofmann published together with the Japanese Mahito Ohgo a standard book about judo, Judo - Basics of Tachi- Waza and Ne-Waza, in the early 1970s, writing in the foreword: 

Hofmann died on 12 March 2020 about two weeks shy of his 79th birthday.

Publications 
 Wolfgang Hofmann: Judo – Grundlagen des Stand- und Bodenkampfes Falken Verlag, 1978,

References

External links
 
 
 
 Wolfgang Hofmann passed away (translation of DJB) judoinside.com

1941 births
2020 deaths
German male judoka
Judoka at the 1964 Summer Olympics
Olympic judoka of the United Team of Germany
Olympic silver medalists for the United Team of Germany
Olympic medalists in judo
Medalists at the 1964 Summer Olympics
Sportspeople from Cologne
20th-century German people
21st-century German people